The Roman-Gallic Wars were a series of conflicts between the forces of ancient Rome and various Celtic groups identified as Gauls. Among these were the Senones, Insubres, Boii and Gaesatae.

Broadly, the Gauls, who crossed the Alps from Transalpine Gaul (France) into Cisalpine Gaul (Italy), tried to expand south through Etruria toward Rome. 

After centuries, Rome emerged victorious in Italy and took the battle across the Alps into Transalpine Gaul.

Cisalpine conflicts
Major conflicts on the Italian side of the Alps include:

390 BC: Brennus leads the Senones to Clusium in Etruria. Rome sends an army to drive the Senones away, which the Senones defeat at the Battle of the Allia. Brennus leads his men on to besiege Rome.

302 BC: Gauls cross the Alps into Cisalpine Gaul, where Gallic tribes allow them to pass southward and some join the march (as do some Etruscans). They pillage Roman territory and retire with the loot, but then fall to fighting among themselves.

298–290 BC: The Third Samnite War. An alliance of Samnites, Gauls, Etruscans and Umbrians fights Rome.

284 BC: The Gauls besiege Arretium. The Romans march to relieve the city, and the Gauls defeat them. Rome then sends a punitive expedition north which defeats the Senones and drives them out of their territory, which Rome occupies. Then in 283 BC the Boii, with Etruscan allies, march on Rome. Rome is victorious at the Battle of Lake Vadimo.

225 BC: The Insubres and Boii hire Alpine Gauls, the Gaesatae, to join them and march on Rome. The Gauls defeated the Romans at Faesulae, but later the Romans defeated the Gauls at Telamon.

223–193 BC: After this came a concerted Roman policy aimed at conquering Gallic territories south of the Alps. Rome invaded the territory of the Insubres in 223 BC, and took Clastidium, Acerrae and Mediolanum in 222 BC. Rome fought Carthage in the Second Punic War (218-201 BC), and the Gauls typically sided with Carthage. After the war, Rome took Bononia (196 BC), Placentia (194 BC) and Mutina (193 BC). After this, many of the surviving Boii retreated north across the Alps to form a new state, Boihaemum.

Transalpine conflicts
125–121 BC: Romans crossed the Alps and fought first the Salluvii and Vocontii, and then Allobroges and Arveni. The Gauls were decisively defeated at the Battle of Vindalium and Battle of the Isère River in 121 BC. The Allobrogian territory was subsequently annexed and incorporated into a Roman province known as Gallia Transalpina.

109 BC: At Cimbrian War, Cimbri and Ambrones, and their allies Helvetii, take victory over a Roman army near Agendicum (Battle of Burdigala) in 107 BC, in which the consul was killed.

58–50 BC: Julius Caesar leads Roman armies in the Gallic Wars in France and Belgium.

40–37 BC: Unrest was the reason for Agrippa's mission to Gaul, where we know he defeated the Aquitani.

28–27 BC: Marcus Valerius Messalla Corvinus suppressed the revolt in Gallia Aquitania, for this feat he celebrated a triumph in 27 BC.

Notes

4th-century BC conflicts
3rd-century BC conflicts
2nd-century BC conflicts
1st-century BC conflicts
4th century BC in the Roman Republic
3rd century BC in the Roman Republic
2nd century BC in the Roman Republic
1st century BC in the Roman Republic
Wars involving the Celts
Pre-Roman Gaul
Wars involving the Roman Republic